The flora of Italy is all the plant life present in the territory of the Italian Republic. The flora of Italy was traditionally estimated to comprise about 5,500 vascular plant species. However, 7,672 species are recorded in the second edition of the flora of Italy and in its digital archives  Digital flora of Italy. In particular, 7,031 are autochthonous and 641 are non native species widely naturalized since more than three decades. Additionally, further 468 exotic species have been recorded as adventitious or naturalized in more recent times.

Geobotanically, the Italian flora is shared between the Circumboreal Region and Mediterranean Region. According to the index compiled by the Italian Ministry for the Environment in 2001, 274 vascular plant species were protected. Italy has 1,371 endemic plant species and subspecies.

Biodiversity 

Italy is one of the richest European countries in both plant and animal biodiversity, with a population very rich in endemic forms. During the Pleistocene glaciations, the Italian territory remained largely free of ice, which allowed the flora and fauna to survive, something that did not happen in the central-northern areas of the continent, and the retreat of the great glaciers has left glacial relict fauna in some mountain locations.

The Italian territory extends over about 10° of latitude, therefore, while remaining in the context of temperate climates without extremes of heat, cold or aridity, the climatic difference between the north and the south of the country is not at all negligible, going from the nival climates of the Alpine peaks, to the cool semi-continental temperate climate of the Po Valley, to the Mediterranean climate of the central-southern coasts and the islands. Italy is predominantly hilly and mountainous in nature of the territory, which has caused a proliferation of ecological niches, close in space but very diversified.

Geography and climate 

Italy consists of a 1,000 km (620 miles) long peninsula extending out into the central Mediterranean, together with a number of islands to the south and west. The Apennines run north-south through the peninsula connecting the Alps in the north to Etna and the Peloritani mountains in Sicily in the south. The geology is diverse.

Northern Italy is dominated by the Alps and an extensive valley of the Po river which is extensively agricultural and industrialised. Central Italy includes the regions of Tuscany, Umbria, Marche and Lazio. It is dominated by the Apennines, from which a few major rivers flow. There are few natural plains. A process of land reclamation has replaced the coastal swamps and marshes with  agricultural land.

Southern Italy includes the regions of Abruzzo, Molise, Apulia, Basilicata, Calabria and Campania. Agriculture and industry are less developed. The main islands are Sicily, Sardinia and the Aeolian Islands. 

Because of the length of the Italian peninsula and the mostly mountainous hinterland, the climate of Italy is highly diverse. In most of the inland northern and central regions, the climate ranges from humid subtropical to humid continental and oceanic. In particular, the climate of the Po valley geographical region is mostly continental, with harsh winters and hot summers. The coastal areas of Liguria, Tuscany and most of the South generally fit the Mediterranean climate stereotype (Köppen climate classification). Each region has a distinct flora.

Ecoregions

An ecoregion is an ecologically and geographically defined area with characteristic natural communities and species. Different ecoregions are distinguished by different vegetation features. Most of the Italian territory is included in the Mediterranean Basin. Important Italian terrestrial ecoregions include the Illyrian deciduous forests, the Italian sclerophyllous and semi-deciduous forests, the South Apennine mixed montane forests, the Tyrrhenian-Adriatic sclerophyllous and mixed forests, Apennine deciduous montane forests, the Dinaric Mountains mixed forests and the Po Basin mixed forests. 

In Italy Carlo Blasi et al. identified and mapped two divisions (Temperate and Mediterranean), 13 provinces, 33 sections and approximately 80 subsections. Each unit has an alphanumeric code that indicates its hierarchical level and a full name that indicates its geographic location and main diagnostic factor.

 the Temperate division includes the Alps, the Po Plain, and most of the Apennines. It accounts for 64% of Italy. This area is characterized by almost absent summer aridity and by marked differences between summer and winter temperatures. The natural vegetation mainly consists of forests, with broad-leaved deciduous plants (Quercus, Fagus and Carpinus species).

 the Mediterranean division includes the southern Apennines, the Tyrrhenian and Ionian coasts, the southern Adriatic coast and the Islands. It accounts for almost 36% of the Italian territory. This area is characterized by summer aridity, with precipitations concentrated in autumn and winter. The natural vegetation mainly consists of mixed woods of evergreen and deciduous species, shrublands and Mediterranean maquis.

The floral composition

The native vegetation of Italy reflects the diversity of the physical environment: the differences in geology, the differences of altitude above sea level and the diversity of the climate between the continental and the peninsular Italy, that give rise to various phytoclimatic areas.

The peninsula and islands are dominated by the characteristics of the Mediterranean climate, with mild and rainy winters and very warm and dry summers. On the contrary, the north of Italy has lower temperatures in winter and a more uniform distribution of rainfall during the summer.

The species of plants present in Italy belong to the flora of the continental Europe or to the Mediterranean flora. In some cases Western species can be distinguished (e.g. the hornbeam, limited to Western Europe) and eastern species (e.g. the oriental hornbeam, present in Eastern Europe).

The last ice age, the Würm Glaciation, in the Alps ended about 12,000 years ago, and one can still recognize its influence on vegetation, in particular by means of glacial relict species. A well known example is the Etna birch (Betula aetniensis), driven in Sicily at a time when the climate was much colder.

Broadly there are three different vegetational zones of forests or bushes in Italy:

 Evergreen vegetation: maquis shrubland (Italian: macchia mediterranea) with densely growing plants and shrubs that always have leaves on. This flora is typical of the dry mediterranean climate, especially along the coast and in the islands. The most common plants are olives (Olea europaea), agrumes (Citrus species), maritime pines (Pinus pinaster), cork oaks (Quercus suber), holm oak, carrubo (Ceratonia siliqua), myrtles (Myrtus communis), strawberry tree (Arbutus unedo), sage, junipers (Juniperus communis, tree heath and bay laurel (Laurus nobilis).(Mediterranean South)

 Broad-leaved vegetation (oaks, beeches, chestnuts): it is typical of the mountain region with a humid climate (Apennines and Prealps). Temperate. The most common plants are Castanea sativa, Fagus sylvatica, the relicts Pinus mugo and Pinus nigra var. italica, Sorbus chamaemespilus, Arctostaphylos uva-ursi, and Vaccinium vitis-idaea. There are also a high number of endemic species increasing at higher elevations. Alpine species include Gentiana nivalis, Androsace alpina, Polygala chamaebuxus, Saxifraga oppositifolia and Carlina acaulis.

 Coniferous vegetation (larches, pines, firs): it is an evergreen vegetation typical of the Alps and of a few high Apennines areas. Temperate. The most common plants present in this phytoclimatic area are Picea abies,  Abies alba, Larix decidua, Pinus sylvestris, Pinus nigra, Pinus cembra and Pinus mugo.

In the Po Basin can be found mixed forests that include mixed deciduous oak/hornbeam forests (Quercus robur, Quercus cerris, Carpinus betulus, Ulmus minor, Fraxinus ornus) and Riparian forest, as well as flood-plain vegetation of the Po Basin (Fraxinus oxycarpa, Salix alba, Alnus glutinosa, Ulmus minor, Populus alba, Populus nigra, Quercus robur).

There are also plant associations almost treeless: grasslands, pastures, deserts. In the mountains, gradually, the forest turns in mountain pastures, scattered in various shrubs (e.g. Pinus mugo, rhododendrons, junipers) and dotted with small colorful flowers. Higher up are the montane grasslands and even areas similar to a desert because they have no or almost no vegetation (rocks, glaciers).

Species richness in Southern Europe
Italy has around  6,711 (6,759) species of vascular plants (Conti et al., 2005 An inventory of vascular plants endemic to Italy), preceded only by the Iberian Peninsula and Balearic Islands with around 7,500 vascular plant taxa (species and subspecies) (Castroviejo 2010 Flora Iberica). In Greece, the number of species is around 5,700 (Strid and Tan, 1997 Flora Hellenica) and in France, there are 4,630 species (Walter and Gillett, 1998 1997 IUCN red list of threatened plants). Per unit area Greece is the country with the highest concentration of native plant species.

Endemic species

Italy has 1,371 endemic plant species and subspecies (18.9% of the total vascular flora). Endemic species include Abies nebrodensis, Allium agrigentinum, Anthemis cupaniana, Calendula maritima, Erysimum etnense, Galium litorale, Petagnaea, Sicilian Fir, Silene hicesiae, Viola ucriana, Zelkova sicula, Aquilegia barbaricina, Aquilegia nuragica, Centaurea gymnocarpa, Centranthus amazonum, Cerastium utriense, Dianthus rupicola, Gagea chrysantha, Galium baldense, Galium glaucophyllum, Genista aetnensis, Hieracium lucidum, Iris benacensis, Iris bicapitata, Iris marsica, Iris pseudopumila, Ophrys calliantha, Orchis brancifortii, Polygala sinisica, Ribes sardoum and Santolina pinnata.

Threats
Habitat loss, fragmentation and degradation are the most significant threats to plant species that occur in Italy. Also changing water flow patterns and over-extraction, increasing droughts due to climate change, pollution and the introduction of alien species threaten the flora. Other threats come from farming (as a result of agricultural expansion and intensification), urbanization and tourism.

The cultivation of plants that give textile fibers (Cannabis sativa, Linum usitatissimum), the cultivation of sugar beet (Beta vulgaris), cereals, potatoes, orchards, vineyards and olive groves have almost replaced the natural vegetation.

The actions of man since Roman times have resulted in the destruction of most of the lowland forests and hills, the expansion of pastures, and the extinction of many species and in the introduction of exotic species which are then naturalized. For example, the Indian fig opuntia (Opuntia ficus-indica), is now common in the warmer parts of the Southern Italy. Also, the invasive false Acacia (Robinia) is widely spread.

Conservation

Italy is a signatory to the Berne Convention on the Conservation of European Wildlife and Natural Habitats and the Habitats Directive both affording protection to Italian fauna and flora. National parks cover about 5% of the country, while the total area protected by national parks, regional parks and nature reserves covers about 10.5% of the Italian territory, to which must be added 12% of coasts protected by marine protected areas.

Notable botanists
Arcangeli, Giovanni. Compendio della flora italiana. Torino: Loescher, 1882.
Cesati, Vincenzo de, Giovanni Passerini & Giuseppe Gibelli. Compendio della flora italiana. Vol. 1-35. Milano: Vallardi, 1868-1886.
Fiori, Adriano. Nuova flora analitica d'Italia. Vol. 1-2. Firenze: Ricci, 1923-1929.
Parlatore, Filippo & Teodoro Caruel. Flora italiana. Vol. 1-10. Firenze: Le Monnier, 1848-1896.
Sandro Pignatti. Flora d'Italia. Vol. 1-3. Bologna: Edagricole, 1982. .
Sandro Pignatti; Riccardo Guarino; Marco La Rosa. Flora d'Italia, 2nd ed. Vol. 1-4. Bologna: Edagricole, Edizioni Agricole di New Business Media 2017-2019.

Herbaria

The following table includes herbaria located in Italy.

Database
The Department of Biology of the University of Trieste houses the  National Data Bank for the Italian Flora and Vegetation.

Botanical gardens

The most important botanical gardens and arboretums in Italy are:
 Orto Botanico dell'Università di Genova
 Orto Botanico di Padova
 Orto Botanico di Brera, Milan
 Orto Botanico di Cascina Rosa, Milan
 Orto Botanico dell'Università di Bologna
 Orto Botanico dell'Università di Torino
 Giardini Botanici Hanbury, Ventimiglia
 Giardino Botanico Alpino "Rezia", Bormio
 Orto Botanico dell'Università di Roma "La Sapienza"
 Orto Botanico dell'Università di Palermo
 Botanical Garden of Naples
 Orto Botanico dell'Università di Cagliari
 Orto Botanico dell'Università di Catania
 Orto Botanico dell'Università di Trieste
 Orto Botanico di Pisa
 Orto Botanico dell'Università di Bari

Historic gardens

The Italian garden is stylistically based on symmetry, axial geometry and on the principle of imposing order over nature. It influenced the history of gardening, especially French gardens and English gardens. The Italian garden was influenced by Roman gardens and Italian Renaissance gardens. The most important historic gardens in Italy are:
 Villa Barbarigo, Galzignano Terme
 Trauttmansdorff Castle Gardens, Merano
 Villa d'Este, Tivoli
 Boboli Gardens, Florence
 Isola Bella, Stresa
 Royal Palace of Caserta
 Garden of Ninfa, Cisterna di Latina
 La Mortella, Ischia
 Parco Giardino Sigurtà, Valeggio sul Mincio
 Giardini Botanici di Villa Taranto, Pallanza
 Villa Cetinale, Sovicille
 Villa di Castello, Florence
 , Oneglia
 Villa Carlotta, Tremezzo

See also

 Apennine deciduous montane forests
 Dinaric Mountains mixed forests
 Flora of the Alps
 Geography of Italy
 High Alps
 Illyrian deciduous forests
 Italian sclerophyllous and semi-deciduous forests
 List of national parks of Italy
 Museo del fiore
 Po Basin mixed forests
 South Apennine mixed montane forests 
 Tyrrhenian-Adriatic sclerophyllous and mixed forests

References

Further reading
 Tutin T.G. et al., 1964-1980. Flora Europaea, Cambridge University Press
 Ansaldi M., Medda E., Plastino S., 1994. I fiori delle Apuane, Mauro Baroni & c. s.a.s., Viareggio
 D. Aeschimann; K. Lauber; D. Martin Moser; J. P. Theurillat. Flora Alpina. Bologna, Zanichelli, 2004.

External links

 Acta Plantarum Checklist. Extensive photo gallery, bibliography. Image access vis "Schede Botaniche" and "Galleria della Flora italiana"
 Ecoregions of Italy Sapienza
 Flora Italiana Digitale - distribution, images (via Google search), flowering time, altitude.
 Melanie Bilz, Shelagh P. Kell, Nigel Maxted and Richard V. Lansdown European Red List of Vascular Plants
 Walter and Gillett, 1998 1997 IUCN red list of threatened plants
 Natura Mediterraneo Forum. Many images (see Galleria Tassonomica) In Italian.
 Franz Xaver/Pflanzen aus Italien